Operation Attila may refer to:

Operation Attila (World War II), a plan for the Nazi occupation of Vichy France
Operation Atilla, actions of the Turkish armed forces during the invasion of Cyprus